Vilém Mrštík (14 May 1863 in Jimramov – 2 March 1912 in Diváky) was a Czech writer and dramatist.

Career
He is known for his novel Santa Lucia (1893). With his brother, Alois (1861–1925) he also wrote the drama Maryša (1894). This play, set in rural Moravia, explored gender roles and tradition in a small village. In contrast to the more positive renderings of rural life by the writers of the National Revival, the brothers attempted a more impartial view of life in the countryside.

He is also famous for having fought against the mass destruction of historic buildings carried out as part of urban renewal plans for parts of Prague by publishing two influential essays: Manifest to the Czech People (1896), and Bestia triumphans in 1897.

Works
 Paní Urbanová (Mrs Urbanová) 1889, drama
 Santa Lucia 1893, novel
 Obrázky (Pictures) 1894, anthology
 Maryša 1895, drama, written with his brother, Alois Mrštík
 Pohádka máje (A May Tale) 1897, novel
 Anežka (Agnes) 1912, drama

References
 https://web.archive.org/web/20120612013916/http://users.ox.ac.uk/~tayl0010/lit_to_1918.htm
 http://encyclopedia2.thefreedictionary.com/Mrstik,+Vilem

External links
 
 

1863 births
1912 deaths
People from Jimramov
Czech male novelists
19th-century Czech novelists
19th-century Czech dramatists and playwrights
Czech male dramatists and playwrights
1912 suicides
Suicides by sharp instrument in the Czech Republic